Jan Butler (born 1953) is an English translator of Russian literature. She translated, among other things, works by Yuri Olesha, Vasily Belov, Fazil Iskander, Yuri Nagibin, Viktoria Tokareva, Yevgeny Yevtushenko, and Nodar Dumbadze.

Personal life
In 1978, Butler married Russian poet Yevgeny Yevtushenko, whose works she had been translating. They had two sons: Sasha (Alexander) and Tosha (Anton). They divorced in 1986.

References

English translators
1953 births
Russian–English translators
Living people